The Evansville Vanderburgh Public Library (EVPL) is a public library system serving Evansville and Vanderburgh County in Indiana, USA. The EVPL also supplements the services provided by the Evansville Vanderburgh School Corporation and has the authority to approve the tax levy of the independently run and operated Willard Library.

The EVPL had a total circulation of 2,922,126 and had 1,842,085 in-person visits to its system in 2013, making it one of the largest public library systems in Indiana. EVPL was rated a five star library by the Library Journal, which places it in the top 1% of public libraries in the U.S. EVPL also obtained a Top Ten library ranking in the 2010 edition of Hennen's American Public Library Ratings, achieving a number eight ranking within its population category.

History 
Evansville's public library system was started in 1848 in the county auditor's office. John Ingle, Jr. was given money to purchase 1,000 books with money approved by the county commissioners. The books were stored in the County Auditor's Office at the old courthouse at Third and Main Streets. The Evansville Library Association was formed in 1855 and Mr. Ingle served as its first President. One thousand shares of stock were authorized at $30.00 per share, and stockholders and patrons who paid $5.00 a year could borrow books. At this point the books were kept at a building at First and Main Streets. In the 1850s and 1860s Pigeon Township, the Mechanics' Association and a local group of Catholics also opened libraries.

By 1874 the County Library had amassed about 3,500 books, but that year the library association closed and gave its books to the city for free public use. Therefore, a new city library was planned and governed by the school board. It was funded through a newpenny tax and located in the former German Reformed Church building at the corner of Seventh and Vine Streets. This library closed in 1885 and gave its collection to Willard Library when it opened.

The foundation for what is now the EVPL began in 1908 when the West Side Business Association decided it wanted to expand library services to that area and sent a request to Andrew Carnegie for funds to build four locations for a new library system in Evansville. Carnegie ultimately offered $50,000 for two locations if the city provided the land. He gave the money to the city in 1911 and two new branches - what is now the East and West Branches - opened on January 1, 1913. Both branches are still operational. Carnegie also gave $10,000 to establish the Cherry Street Library to serve the city's black community. It opened in 1914.

Miss Ethel McCollough, for whom the McCollough Branch is named, became head librarian during the 1920s. She provided the leadership which brought great improvements to the Evansville library system. In 1922 she and the library commissioned a neighborhood survey that sent a citizen's advisory committee out on several hundred home visits. Historians have described the Evansville survey as "exceptional for its time", because it relied neither on impressionistic observations nor on indirect sources like circulation records.

Central Library 

The old Central Library in downtown Evansville was an Art Deco building. It was built in 1931 and opened in 1932. The old building now houses the Children's Museum of Evansville. The new 145,000 square foot Central Library building opened in September 2004, replacing a building one-fourth of its size. In 2013, the EVPL purchased land nearby from the Evansville Rescue Mission, further expanding the Central Library footprint.

Services 
There are over 130 public access computers. Other features include the READ Center with story room, an enclosed garden and activity area, the Popular Materials Center which includes the Teen Zone, the Reference and Technology Center, study rooms and meeting rooms, the Talking Books Service, a book corner, and a garden. The Central Library also features the Indiana Room, which contains volumes of information on Evansville history in addition to a large, indexed clipping file that can be used for local research. Local artists' work is found throughout the library.

Local history 
The EVPL has an extensive collection of local history articles. After the Evansville Press ceased publication on December 31, 1998, it donated its archives jointly to the EVPL and Willard Library. The library also houses the Browning Genealogy Database, the lifetime work of Charles Browning, who compiled the obituary records of Vanderburgh County and surrounding southwestern Indiana from the Evansville newspapers. Browning's two monumental biographical works, People of Evansville in World War II (about 40,000 biographical cards), and his People Study (about 537,000 biographical cards), are now online. This project was supported by the Institute of Museums and Library Services under the provisions of the Library Services and Technology Act by the Indiana State Library and Historical Bureau.

Branch Libraries

East and West Branches 
The East and West Branch Libraries are Carnegie Libraries built in the style of Beaux Arts Classicism. Negotiations between Andrew Carnegie and the Evansville library committee began in 1909 with a petition to Carnegie for funding a west side library. Over a two-year correspondence, the request was expanded to include a facility for Evansville's growing "East End." In January 1911, Carnegie agreed to give $50,000 for building two libraries. Land between Bayard Park and the Chandler Avenue School was purchased for the east side library from the school board with money raised by Bayard Park residents through popular subscription and by a generous contribution from one of Evansville's own industrialists and benefactors, Major Albert Carl Rosencranz (1842–1920), owner of Vulcan Plow Works.

Construction on both $25,000 buildings began in summer 1911 on plans prepared by Carnegie-approved architects Clifford Shopbell & Company of Evansville. The style of each building was a simplified version of Beaux Arts Classicism. The Shopbell interpretation featured a rectangular red brick structure, based on a foundation of dressed Indiana limestone and lavished with classically inspired, cream-colored terra cotta ornamentation from Chicago.

Both libraries were completed by the end of 1912 and dedicated on January 1, 1913. At the time of their opening they collectively held a total of 5,527 books. The twin branches were renovated and restored in 2003. Each sits in a park-like setting and has meeting rooms, public access computers, and adult and youth areas.

McCollough Branch 
The McCollough Branch opened to the public in 1965, and was renovated and reopened in December 2006. Named in honor of Ethel McCollough, the first Director of the Evansville Vanderburgh Public Library, the branch is located behind Washington Square Mall. Recent renovations changed the layout, design, and feel of the interior adding an adult seating area, a colorful kid's zone and a teen area. The meeting room seats up to 100. A variety of programs for adults and youth are presented throughout the year.

North Park Branch 

The North Park Branch is a 20,000 square foot facility that was dedicated in April 2005. It replaced an 11,000 square foot 1960's building that was donated to Holly's House, a child and adult advocacy center for victims of intimate crimes.

The new building is constructed in the manner of the great lodges found in national parks. North Park has a teen canteen, children's tower with wild life mural, an adult tower with a ceiling high stone fireplace, meeting and study rooms as well as an enclosed outdoor patio area. North park also has an active book discussion program, reflecting popular, mystery, and classic genres.

Oaklyn Branch 

Oaklyn Branch opened in spring 2003, replacing the former location in an old school building at the corner of Oak Hill and Lynch Roads. Built into the side of a hill and surrounded by meadows and woods, it has open spaces, earth colors, murals, a virtual fireplace, study rooms, 30 public computers, a popular meeting room, and a small vending area.

Oaklyn Branch has a green roof of prairie grass and wild flowers. The flat 17,250-square-foot roof sits underneath 16 inches of soil. It is designed to keep the library cooler in the summer and warmer in the winter. The roof also provides ecological benefits that plants bring. The LightBridge clerestory that rises above the roof meadow is intended as a metaphor for the mission of the library.

The building has received national attention and won multiple design awards, including recognition by the American Institute of Architects for its thoughtful ecological and accessible design.

Red Bank Branch 
Red Bank Branch opened in September 1991. Located just off the Lloyd Expressway on west Red Bank Road, it was renovated in 2006.

Stringtown Branch 
When it opened in 1939, Stringtown Library was located two blocks beyond the end of the trolley line. At the time it was called the North Branch, but was renamed in 1985. Today, it is surrounded by the growth of the city and anchors the Stringtown Herndon Drive neighborhood. Stringtown underwent a major renovation in 2003 that included new lighting, flooring, computer carrels, and rest rooms.

Administration 
The EVPL is governed by a Board of Trustees made up of seven members who are appointed as follows:  two members by the County Commissioners of Vanderburgh County, two members by the County Council of Vanderburgh County, and three members by the Evansville Vanderburgh School Corporation. EVPL is a municipal corporation with the power and authority to levy taxes. The EVPL also has the authority to approve the tax levy of the independently run and operated Willard Library.

References

Resources
 Evansville-Vanderburgh Public Libraries website
 EVPL Centennial collection of digitized images and other historical items

County library systems in Indiana
Education in Evansville, Indiana
Education in Vanderburgh County, Indiana
1848 establishments in Indiana